The 101st Air Refueling Wing (101 ARW) is a unit of the Maine Air National Guard, stationed at Bangor Air National Guard Base, Bangor, Maine. If activated to federal service with the United States Air Force, the 101 ARW is operationally-gained by the Air Mobility Command (AMC).

Units
In the late 2010s the wing consists of the following major units:
 101st Operations Group
 132d Air Refueling Squadron (KC-135R)
 101st Maintenance Group
 101st Mission Support Group
 101st Medical Group

History

The mission of the 101st FIW was the air defense of New England. Its assigned squadrons were dispersed and equipped as follows: 
 132d Fighter-Interceptor Squadrons, Dow AFB (F-80C)
 133d Fighter-Interceptor Squadrons, Grenier AFB (F-47D)
 134th Fighter-Interceptor Squadrons, Burlington Municipal Airport (F-51H)

Lineage

 Established as the 101st Fighter Wing in October 1950
 Activated on 25 October 1950
 Federalized and ordered to active service on 1 February 1951
 Redesignated 101st Fighter-Interceptor Wing on 10 February 1951
 Inactivated on 6 February 1952
 Released from active duty and returned to Maine state control on 1 November 1952
 Activated and received federal recognition on 1 November 1952
 Redesignated 101st Air Defense Wing on 14 April 1956
 Redesignated 101st Fighter-Interceptor Wing on 10 June 1972
 Redesignated 101st Air Refueling Wing on 1 July 1976

Assignments
 Maine Air National Guard, 25 October 1950
 Eastern Air Defense Force, 10 February 1951
 Western Air Defense Force 2 August 1951  – 6 February 1952
 Maine Air National Guard, 1 November 1952 – present

 Gaining commands
 Air Defense Command (later Aerospace Defense Command), 1 November 1952
 Strategic Air Command, 1 July 1976
 Air Combat Command, 1 June 1992
 Air Mobility Command, 1 June 1993 – present

Components
 101st Fighter-Interceptor Group (later 101st Fighter Group), 10 February 1951 – 6 February 1952; 1 November 1952 – 30 April 1954, 1 June 1954 – 31 March 1956, 15 April 1956 – 1 September 1960
 101st Fighter Group (later 101st Fighter-Interceptor Group, 101st Air Refueling Group, 101st Operations Group), 1 September 1960 – 31 March 1976, 16 March 1992 – present
 158th Fighter Group (Air Defense), 15 April 1956 – 1 July 1960

 132d Fighter Squadron (later 132d Fighter-Interceptor Squadron, 132d Air Refueling Squadron), 31 March 1976 - (present?)

Stations
 Dow Air Force Base, Maine, 25 October 1950
 Grenier Air Force Base, New Hampshire, 23 April 1951
 Larson Air Force Base, Washington, 2 August 1951 – 6 February 1952
 Dow Air Force Base (later Bangor International Airport, Bangor Air National Guard Base), 1 November 1952 – present

Aircraft
 F-80C Shooting Star, 1950–1952
 F-86F Sabre 1952–1955
 F-94A Starfire, 1955–1957
 F-89D Scorpion, 1957–1959
 F-89J Scorpion, 1959–1969
 F-102A Delta Dagger 1959
 F-101B Voodoo 1969–1976
 KC-135A Stratotanker, 1976–1984
 KC-135E Stratotanker, 1984–2007
 KC-135R Stratotanker, 2007 – present

References

Notes

Bibliography

 
 McLaren, David (2004), Lockheed P-80/F-80 Shooting Star: A Photo Chronicle, Schiffer Publishing, Ltd.; First Edition,

External links
 134th Fighter Squadron lineage and history
 158th Fighter Wing History
  Cornett, Lloyd H. and Johnson, Mildred W., A Handbook of Aerospace Defense Organization  1946 – 1980, Office of History, Aerospace Defense Center, Peterson AFB, CO (1980).
 101st Air Refueling Wing website

Wings of the United States Air National Guard
Bangor, Maine
0101
Military units and formations in Maine
Military units and formations established in 1976
1976 establishments in the United States